The Carlson Skycycle is an American, single-seat, low-wing, single-engine, homebuilt aircraft that was originally designed by A. Hanford Eckman in 1945 and re-designed as a replica by Ernst W. Carlson and produced by Carlson Aircraft of East Palestine, Ohio in kit form. The prototype was completed in 1995.

The Carlson Skycycle is a full-size replica of the Piper PA-8 Skycycle and the prototype was donated to the Piper Aviation Museum when no orders for the aircraft kit were forthcoming.

Design and development
Carlson Skycycle was conceived by designer Ernst W. Carlson as a tribute to the original design of A. Hanford Eckman at Piper Airplane Corporation. The original PA-8 was intended to have been one of Piper Aircraft]'s post-World War II aircraft models, but only the prototype was built and it did not enter production.

Carlson set out to build a replica as close as possible to the original, working from the only surviving documents, some sketches, a few photographs and one three-view drawing. The original materials were not duplicated and the Carlson model is built with a fiberglass fuselage over a welded steel frame, with a 2024-T3 aluminium tail cone, supported by internal bulkheads. The aircraft has a Plexiglas canopy.

Carlson's plan in recreating the Skycycle was to offer kits for sale, but the design requires factory assistance and special tooling to complete and no kits beyond the prototype were completed. Construction time from the kit was intended to be 800 hours.

Specifications (Skycycle)

See also

References

Homebuilt aircraft
Replica aircraft